Crossing Continents is a half-hour BBC Radio 4 documentary strand focusing on foreign affairs issues. It takes listeners right to the heart of story through its on-location reporting and feature making.  The programmes are character driven and offer powerful storytelling and a deep understanding of the context in which events take place no matter where they are in the world.   Crossing Continents is broadcast 28 times a year on Thursdays at 11:00, with repeats on Mondays at 20:30 and is available from the BBC as a podcast as well as on iPlayer and via on-demand.

Crossing Continents has received many awards including from the Foreign Press Association Awards; One World Media Awards; Amnesty International Awards and some Sony Awards.  Its most recent success was Best Radio Award at the Amnesty International Awards 2016 for Stealing Innocence in Malawi reported by Ed Butler.

See also
 From Our Own Correspondent
 List of BBC Radio 4 programmes

References

External links
 Crossing Continents website

BBC Radio 4 programmes
British documentary radio programmes